WVLG (640  kHz) is a commercial AM radio station licensed to Wildwood, Florida, and serving The Villages. It is owned by Village Communications and airs a full service  classic hits radio format.  World and national news is provided by Fox News Radio.

By day, WVLG broadcasts at 930 watts, reducing power at night to 860 watts.  It uses a non-directional antenna at all times.  The station is also heard on two FM translator stations:  W274BR 102.7 MHz in the northern part of the listening area and W283DK 104.5 in the southern part.

History

In 1986, the station signed on as WHOF.  It was owned by Walker Heart of Florida Broadcasting, and the station was licensed in Wildwood, Florida but had a studio in Leesburg, Florida. In 1987, the station was sold to Jim Patrick, operated as WMZY, and played Contemporary Christian music.  It changed to WHOF in 1988 and offered Christian talk and teaching programming.

In 2001 the station was purchased by the Senior Broadcasting Corporation.  For a time it concentrated on Adult Standards music.  But in the 2000s, the focus switched to Soft Oldies of the 1960s, 70s and 80s.  As of 2002, WVLG played "a lot more Paul Simon and Bruce Springsteen than Frank Sinatra and Duke Ellington."

In 2011, the station was sold for $750,000 to Villages Communications.

References

External links

 
 
 
 

VLG
Radio stations established in 1986
1986 establishments in Florida
Sumter County, Florida